Ayan Babakishiyeva (Ayan Babakişiyeva) (born April 12, 1989, Ganja) is a Azerbaijani singer and actress.

Early years
Ayan was born in a family of Mountain Jews in Ganja, Azerbaijan SSR in 1989. She has one brother.

Ayan learned how to play the piano from an early age, and because of that, she was enlisted in music school to study piano. She graduated from secondary school at the Jalal Pashayeh High School No. 39 in her native Ganja. While she was still in school, she was a soloist in both the school's choir as well as the choir of the music school, which took her to various competitions across Azerbaijan.

Music career
Her music career started in 2006 with Elchin Imanov's song "Senin Xatirine". In November 2008, she launched her first EP, "Yağış" (Rain), which was on the top of the radio charts in Azerbaijan for weeks. As a result of her success, in 2009 she was awarded the "Most Productive Singer of the Year" by the Baku Department of Culture and Tourism. At the end of 2009, Ayana was presented with a different project; she recorded a version in Juhuri translated by Dmitry Rakhanayev of the song "Nigaranam", originally written by Kamaladdin Heydarov; thus she became the first professional singer to record a song in this language, Dule e pese. Her music repertoire includes songs in Azerbaijani, Juhuri, Hebrew, Turkish and Russian.

Personal life
She had a 7-year relationship with the judoka and vice-president of the Azerbaijan Taekwondo Federation Fuzuli Musayev, with whom she had a daughter in 2013 named Selena. After her separation from Musayev, Musayev did not recognize the child, and resorted to all means to ban Babakishiyeva from TV channels and keep her away from the country. After pressure from Musayev, Babakishyieva moved to Turkey for three years and then returned to Azerbaijan, when she launched her album Gorxuram Gecelerden.

Discography
Senin Xatirine (2006)
Yağış (2008)
Ya Ona Dön, Ya Meni Sev (2013)
Gorxuram Gecelerden (2016)
Menim Üreym (2019)
Senin Üçün  (2020) (EP)
Yuxunda Ayan Olum (2020)
Ah Necedir Seninçün (2021)

Film career
Tanrıverdinin nağılı  (2008)

References

21st-century Azerbaijani women singers
Azerbaijani child singers
Mountain Jews
1989 births
Living people